The (Avigdor Hirsch) Torah Temimah Primary School, located in the former Dollis Hill Synagogue, is a one form entry Voluntary Aided maintained primary school in the London Borough of Brent.  It is a strictly Orthodox Jewish single-sex primary school for up to 204 boys aged 3–11.  The school includes a Nursery.

History

The school was opened in 1989 when a group of parents found that local Jewish schools in north west London were becoming overcrowded, and who in addition wanted a school that aligned to the style of education that they wished for their children - a single-sex boys' school with: orthodox Jewish practice; pre-eminence given to a high standard of Jewish Torah studies; moral, spiritual and personal development of pupils to high standards; and a broad secular education to a high standard (including the UK National Curriculum) compatible with orthodox Jewish values. Its first premises was in Golders Green before moving to Woodside Park Synagogue.  Having outgrown the Synagogue premises, in 1996 the school moved to permanent accommodation in what was formerly the Dollis Hill Synagogue, which the school purchased from the United Synagogue in 1995 for £360,000.

Originally called just Torah Temimah Primary School, the school name was changed to Avigdor Hirsch Torah Temimah Primary School when the new building was dedicated in memory of the late Avigdor Hirsch, whose family made a donation to the school for this purpose. It is still known as Torah Temimah for most practical purposes but is sometimes listed as Avigdor Hirsch Torah Temimah in official documents and other sources. "Torah Temimah" means "perfect Torah" in Hebrew and the name is taken from Psalms 19:8. The school is sometimes mistakenly confused with the former Avigdor Primary School, also an orthodox Jewish Voluntary Aided primary school, in the Stamford Hill area of the London Borough of Hackney, which closed in 2005; there was never any connection between the two schools (although a former Headteacher of Torah Temimah, Rabbi Yitzchak Freeman, was also a former Headteacher [2003-2005] of Avigdor Primary School).

The school became voluntary-aided (VA) in the London Borough of Brent in April 2000. Rabbi Ephraim Klyne was appointed as Principal and Head Teacher in 1989 and remained in this post until September 2002 when he was promoted to the position of Menahel (Principal) with responsibility for the religious ethos and direction of the school.  In September 2002, Anthony Wolfson was appointed Headteacher, a post he held for eight years.  Wolfson left in July 2010 to take up another headship and was succeeded by Rabbi Yitzchak Freeman, previously Head at Kisharon. In August 2021, Rabbi Freeman retired and was succeeded as Headteacher by Michael Coleman.

Achievements and standards

Ofsted (September2016)  graded the school as Good. The majority of students achieve above-average levels in SATs.

Torah Temimah holds a Healthy Schools bronze award and an Eco Schools award. It is a member of the Brent Schools Partnership.

Architecture of the building
(This section includes information taken from: Constructing Identity: Anglo-Jewry and Synagogue Architecture by Sharman Kadish, Architectural History Vol. 45 (2002) pp. 386–408; Diary of Dollis Hill 1929-1996, published in pamphlet form by Michael Brooke in 1996 to mark the rededication of the building as the Torah Temimah Primary School; and the Wikipedia entry for Dollis Hill Synagogue. There are a small number of mostly minor discrepancies in certain historical, technical and chronological details between these sources.)

The school occupies the building and site of the former Dollis Hill Synagogue. The Dollis Hill Jewish community had its origins, like other suburban London Jewish communities, in the emigration of families from the Whitechapel and neighbouring areas of London's East End to the more affluent suburbs in the 1920s. An organized Jewish community was formally constituted locally in 1929, and included families from what became the Willesden, Cricklewood and Neasden synagogues. For the first few years, services were held in a number of temporary rented rooms and halls. A separate Dollis Hill Hebrew Congregation was formed in 1933 and affiliated to the United Synagogue. This congregation also used a number of temporary premises for some years. The fledgling Dollis Hill Hebrew Congregation leased surplus railway land from the London, Midland and Scottish Railway Company in 1933 and held services in a building on the area of what is now the school playground. The site freehold was acquired from the railway company, together with some adjoining land, for £980 in 1937.

The current synagogue building was commissioned by the growing Dollis Hill Jewish community from Sir Owen Williams. The foundation stone was laid in February 1937.

Owen Williams  acted as both architect and engineer for this building project, which, unlike most of the commissions he received in his career, did not have a government body or industrial company as its client. Its design was undertaken at the same time as the larger and more complex Daily Express building in Manchester. Its smaller predecessor subsequently served as a community centre and hall.

The new synagogue was consecrated in 1938. Kadish states that it held 640 people — 324 men at ground level and 316 women at gallery level. Brooke states that the synagogue sat 916 people in total: 524 men downstairs and 392 women in the gallery. Undated but evidently early floor plans held by English Heritage show a total of 845 seats: 529 for men downstairs (including 5 wardens' seats but excluding the two rabbi's seats), and 316 for women in the gallery. These different figures may reflect misreading of plans or typographical errors in sources; or they may reflect different seating plans at various stages in the synagogue's life.

The main elements of the building are the hall (sanctuary, the main area used for worship), a two-storey entrance area with offices and cloakrooms, and a smaller two-storey block at the rear. For Williams, the site had few of the design challenges he was used to — no industrial processes to accommodate, no difficult city centre location, no long spans, no exceptional heights or other engineering problems. Instead, this building called for a sensitive architectural solution. Concrete was Williams' material of choice and here he used reinforced concrete, generally only 125mm in thickness, cast in situ behind a cork lining left exposed as the internal wall finish. With this system, he created a series of vertical planes, zig-zagged in plan to enclose the hall, with similarly folded planes for its roof. With a span of 18.3m, the roof is of sufficient transverse pitch for rainwater drainage, so asphalt weatherproofing was not needed. The hall or sanctuary is the centrepiece of the building and it consists of three bays each 6.1m wide, delineated by the folded planes described. The concrete is thickened at the folds, allowing enough strength for the walls to carry the cantilevered galleries, which sit in the Vs of the chevron-plan walls. The two-storey parts of the complex are rectilinear in plan with flat roofs.

The blandness of the outside walls is relieved by two types of emblematic window openings: hexagonal windows enclosing the shape of the Star of David; and windows with an inverted arch form that includes a stylistic echo of the form of the traditional Jewish seven-branched candelabrum (the "menorah") from the ancient Temple in Jerusalem. These windows run in horizontal rows around the building. The hexagonal windows are of stained glass and are themed around the months and festivals of the Jewish year and the Twelve Tribes of Israel. Although all the designs are different, these windows have colours and other stylistic elements in common that give coherence and a sense of unity to the collection. The inverted arch form windows are of plain clear glass. Williams later justified the whimsical window forms as being of structural relevance to a girder-like concrete element.

The building was the first in Britain built entirely with pre-stressed concrete. To cast the concrete, plywood shuttering was used. Because of the limitations of this technique, unintended horizontal bands appear on the external walls every 1.2m, where the joints between the levels of shuttering were inadequately sealed. There was also some bowing of the plywood under the pressure of the drying concrete, which caused some bowing of the wall planes.

Dollis Hill Synagogue is considered one of Williams’ least successful ventures into architecture. It was not well received by the client and he was forced to concede a part of his design fee in order to settle with them. The cost of the building was £18,200.

The synagogue building was completed and consecrated in 1938. It was extensively modernised and rededicated in 1956.

The original community hall, used as the congregation's first permanent home from 1932 or 1933, stood next to the new synagogue building, and was also subsequently modernised around 1952. It stood until 1996 when it was demolished to make space for the school playground.

The synagogue building was registered as a Grade II listed building by English Heritage in 1988, fifty years after its construction.

The United Synagogue sold the building to the Trustees of Torah Temimah Primary School in 1996.

To create the school, six classrooms were constructed in the ground floor main sanctuary area, plus offices in the entrance foyer. An additional floor was also constructed across the whole of the main sanctuary area apart from a space in front of the original synagogue Ark, which was left as an atrium to keep the original Ark location and surrounding features visible. The Ark itself was removed. This additional floor, which linked the women's galleries down each side, was divided to form two further classrooms, a school hall, and smaller teaching and storage areas. Many of the original building features were maintained, including the main entrance doors, windows and internal oak panelling.  The cost was £1,000,000.

References

External links
 Official website
  Department for Education Edubase record for Torah Temimah Primary School
  Schoolsfinder UK government web site
  DCSF UK government performance tables 2007
  Jstor article on Anglo-Jewry and Synagogue Architecture

Primary schools in the London Borough of Brent
Jewish schools in England
Voluntary aided schools in London
Boys' schools in London
Educational institutions established in 1989
1989 establishments in England